James McKernan (born November 7, 1945) is an American educational theorist,. He is Professor of Education at East Carolina University, a constituent campus of the University of North Carolina. He has been the King Distinguished Professor and Chair of Education at East Carolina University; Dean and Chair of the Faculty of Education at the University of Limerick, Ireland; College Lecturer, Faculty of Arts, University College Dublin, Ireland and Fulbright Scholar at the Harvard Graduate School of Education and University of Pennsylvania Graduate School of Education and Research Fellow, Northern Ireland Council for Educational Research, Department of Psychology, Queen's University of Belfast. McKernan has taught Palestinian university students when Israel closed schools and colleges there.

Early life and education
McKernan was born in Philadelphia, Pennsylvania, the youngest of six children, and educated at St. Vincent De Paul Grammar School, Germantown, and Cardinal Dougherty High School. His father Bernard was an unlettered man but established a belief in education as a way 'out of the muck'.

Upon graduation, McKernan went to sea in the US Merchant Marine. He then attended  St. Joseph's University, Philadelphia and received his BA  at Temple University in 1969. During the course of his education, he also sailed as an Ordinary Seaman, worked in a steel mill and entered the US Navy,  seeing action in the Vietnam War.

He then began postgraduate studies in Education under Eustas O hEideain, O.P. at University College Galway, National University of Ireland.

McKernan hold a B.Sc.Ed degree from Temple University (1969); the M.A. (Hons) degree from University College Galway, Ireland (1973) working on  an ethnographic study of Irish Travellers (nomads) children's education, and  Doctor of Philosophy degree from the University of Ulster (1978).

Career
McKernan acted as Project Officer with the Schools Cultural Studies Curriculum Project which brought Catholic and Protestant secondary schools together in a curriculum development project focused upon peace, tolerance and mutual understanding in Northern Ireland during its civil unrest.  He completed his doctoral research under Hugh T. Sockett on "Teaching Controversial Issues in Northern Ireland" at the University of Ulster and was appointed a postdoctoral research fellow at Queen's University of Belfast in 1979. The project developed the notion of the 'teacher as researcher' and used action research (Lewin, 1946) to improve difficult and problematic situations in school practice. This period was significant for laying the basis for his commitment to the disadvantaged and in the development of his own political ideology.

In 1980 McKernan was appointed as a College Lecturer in Education at University College Dublin where he established Curriculum Studies as a new field of teaching and educational inquiry in the Education Department. In 1991 he accepted the King Distinguished Professorship at East Carolina University in Greenville, North Carolina, US. He returned briefly to act as Dean and Chair of the Education Faculty at the University of Limerick, Ireland in 1993.   McKernan returned to East Carolina University in 1994.

Educational theory
McKernan's educational theory emphasizes the teacher as researcher and schools as agencies of cultural reconstruction using action research  to improve school practices. His curriculum theory  rejects the use of educational objectives determined in advance of instruction in favor of a "procedural model" of design that elicits the intrinsic values of the educational experience as the aim of the educational encounter, and not a pre-specified outcome. He is an advocate for action research,  the idea that research should be conducted by the practitioner who experiences a problem, with a view to improving the quality of action in the problematic situation through reconstructed actions. His theory holds that there is no division of labor between teachers and researchers and that school practices will only be improved by teachers researching their own practices.

Honours
McKernan was cited for his distinguished service with the United States Navy while serving in the Guided Missile Destroyer Leader  during its Westpac tour in the Vietnam War and also by President Obama for his educational service to the United States, Palestine, the Republic of Ireland and his work for peace through education in Northern Ireland.

McKernan is listed in Marquis' 'Who's Who in America and has served as Secretary for the Galway Itinerant Settlement Committee, Galway, Ireland which provided housing for homeless Irish "Travellers" (nomadic persons). He is a founding member of the Educational Studies Association of Ireland and was Editor of its journal Irish Educational Studies. He has also acted as General Editor of the Yearbooks of the South Atlantic Philosophy of Education Society (1998–2004) and was President of the Society during 2003-2005.

Published works
McKernan has authored more than one hundred publications as author, co-author, or editor in books, book chapters, and scholarly journals in the US, the United Kingdom, Ireland, Australia, France, Brazil, China, Germany, Canada and Sweden

Books
Curriculum and Imagination: Process Theory, Pedagogy and Action Research (London: Routledge) 2008 240 pp.
Curriculum Action Research (London: Kogan Page) 1996 278 pp.
Transfer at Fourteen: The Craigavon Two-Tier System as an Organizational Innovation in Education (Belfast: Northern Ireland Council for Educational Research) pp. 114, 1981.
The Challenge of Change: Curriculum Development in Irish Post-Primary Schools 1970–1984.  (Dublin: Institute of Public Administration)  pp 163, 1984 with Dr. T. Crooks, Trinity College, Dublin (Co-author)
Learning for Life: Tutor's Guide   co-authored with E. Moore; E. O Donohue; J. Heuston; D. Condren and S. Fogarty. (Dublin: Gill and Macmillan Co.) pp. ;145, 1986

Footnotes

1945 births
Living people
Academics of the University of Limerick
Academics of University College Dublin
American educational theorists
American education writers
American expatriates in Ireland
East Carolina University faculty
United States Navy personnel of the Vietnam War
United States Merchant Mariners